"Failed Experiments" is the nineteenth episode of the third season of the American television series Agents of S.H.I.E.L.D., based on the Marvel Comics organization S.H.I.E.L.D. (Strategic Homeland Intervention, Enforcement and Logistics Division), revolving around the character of Phil Coulson and his team of S.H.I.E.L.D. agents as they attempt to defeat Hive. It is set in the Marvel Cinematic Universe (MCU), sharing continuity with the films of the franchise. The episode was written by Brent Fletcher, and directed by Wendey Stanzler.

Clark Gregg reprises his role as Coulson from the film series, and is joined by series regulars Ming-Na Wen, Brett Dalton, Chloe Bennet, Iain De Caestecker, Elizabeth Henstridge, Henry Simmons, and Luke Mitchell.

"Failed Experiments" originally aired on ABC on May 3, 2016, and according to Nielsen Media Research, was watched by 2.92 million viewers.

Plot
Radcliffe's first attempt to turn humans into Inhumans fails when the Hydra operatives used as test subjects die, and he realises that living Kree blood is needed. Wanting her friends at SHIELD to feel what she is feeling while under Hive's control, Daisy suggests to him that they turn the agents into Inhumans once Radcliffe's experiments succeed. Hive is concerned that Daisy still cares about her human friends, worrying she will not be able to fight them if necessary.

Fitz and Simmons create a potential cure for Hive's infection, but it could destroy the immune system of an Inhuman it is used on. Lincoln offers to be a test subject, but Coulson forbids him. However he later injects himself with the antitoxin anyway, leaving him severely weakened, while proving it would not work against Hive's infection. His immune system having shut down, Lincoln is put in quarantine until he recovers.

Daisy is caught on surveillance by SHIELD, revealing Hive's location to them, but while Mack believes she is resisting the enthrallment and trying to contact SHIELD for help, Coulson suspects a trap. He sends a team led by May and Mack to infiltrate the town and assassinate Hive, and May poses as a Hydra operative to trick James into revealing Hive's whereabouts. The team find the Kree artifact, revealed to be a beacon, which Hive is using to signal to a meteor orbiting Earth. The meteor crashes in the town, and two Kree Reapers, who have been cryogenically preserved inside for over a thousand years, emerge and begin hunting for Inhumans, having been put in orbit by their masters as a fail-safe in case the Inhumans rebelled against them.

One of the Reapers attacks Hive, who eventually kills him in a fight, after which the SHIELD team attempt to destroy Hive with a grenade launcher, which proves insufficient. The other Kree kills Alisha before Daisy incapacitates him, and Radcliffe begins draining his blood. Mack approaches Daisy and tries to convince her to leave with him, still believing she is resisting Hive's control, but she denies it and reveals Hive's plan to transform humankind. Mack then vaporizes the captured Kree with a Hydra splinter bomb, and a livid Daisy attacks him, subduing him with her powers and beating him savagely. May shoots her to save Mack, and the SHIELD agents escape while Radcliffe tends to Hive and Daisy's injuries. Remembering that there is Kree blood inside her from the GH325 injected into her after she was shot by Ian Quinn, Daisy offers to let her blood be harvested.

Production

Development
In April 2016, Marvel announced that the nineteenth episode of the season would be titled "Failed Experiments", to be written by Brent Fletcher, with Wendey Stanzler directing.

Casting

In April 2016, Marvel revealed that main cast members Clark Gregg, Ming-Na Wen, Brett Dalton, Chloe Bennet, Iain De Caestecker, Elizabeth Henstridge, Nick Blood, Adrianne Palicki, Henry Simmons, and Luke Mitchell would star as Phil Coulson, Melinda May, Grant Ward, Daisy Johnson, Leo Fitz, Jemma Simmons, Lance Hunter, Bobbi Morse, Alphonso "Mack" MacKenzie, and Lincoln Campbell, respectively. It was also revealed that the guest cast for the episode would include Axle Whitehead as James, John Hannah as Holden Radcliffe, Alicia Vela-Bailey as Alisha, Alexander Wraith as Agent Anderson, Mark Atteberry as Kurt Vogel, Derek Phillips as Agent O'Brien, Briana Venskus as Agent Piper, Lynn Longosz as Kree reaper #1 and Chris Hubbard as Kree reaper #2. Vela-Bailey, Wraith, Atteberry, Venskus, Longosz, and Hubbard did not receive guest star credit in the episode. Whitehead, Hannah, Vela-Bailey, Wraith, Atteberry, and Phillips reprise their roles from earlier in the series. Blood and Palicki do not ultimately appear.

Broadcast
"Failed Experiments" was first aired in the United States on ABC on May 3, 2016.

Reception

Ratings
In the United States the episode received a 0.9/3 percent share among adults between the ages of 18 and 49, meaning that it was seen by 0.9 percent of all households, and 3 percent of all of those watching television at the time of the broadcast. It was watched by 2.92 million viewers.

References

External links
"Failed Experiments" at ABC

Agents of S.H.I.E.L.D. (season 3) episodes
2016 American television episodes